Monika Grikšaitė (born 7 June 1999) is a Lithuanian footballer who plays as a midfielder for Lithuanian Women's A League club FK Banga and the Lithuania women's national team.

Club career
Grikšaitė has played for Banga in Lithuania.

International career
Grikšaitė capped for Lithuania at senior debut during the UEFA Women's Euro 2022 qualifying.

References

1999 births
Living people
Lithuanian women's footballers
Women's association football midfielders
Lithuania women's international footballers